Tytroca dispar is a moth of the family Noctuidae first described by Rudolf Püngeler in 1904. It is found in semi-deserts and deserts from the Sahara, the Arabian Peninsula, Israel, Jordan and the Sinai.

The female adult of this species has a wingspan of 27 mm.

There are multiple generations per year. Adults are on wing year round.

The larvae feed on Acacia species.

References

External links

Image

Catocalinae
Moths of the Middle East